Carmen Patricia Martínez (born 26 December 1982) is a Paraguayan long distance runner who specialises in the marathon. She finished 115th in the 2016 Olympic marathon in a time of 2 hours 56 minutes and 43 seconds. She served as the flag bearer for Paraguay during the closing ceremony.

In 2015, she received the Victory of Gold award for best athlete of the year from the Paraguay Sports Journalists' Circle; she was also named Athlete of the Year 2015 by the Paraguayan Athletics Federation.

See also
 List of Paraguayan records in athletics

References

External links

 

1982 births
Living people
Paraguayan female long-distance runners
Paraguayan female marathon runners
Place of birth missing (living people)
Athletes (track and field) at the 2016 Summer Olympics
Olympic athletes of Paraguay
World Athletics Championships athletes for Paraguay
Athletes (track and field) at the 2018 South American Games
21st-century Paraguayan women